USS California (SSN-781), is the eighth , and the seventh United States Navy ship named for the state of California. The contract to build her was awarded to Newport News Shipbuilding  (then called Newport News Shipbuilding & Drydock Co.) in Newport News, Virginia, on 14 August 2003. Construction began in December 2006. Californias keel was laid down on 1 May 2009.
She was christened on 6 November 2010, sponsored by Donna Willard, wife of Admiral Robert F. Willard.
She was launched eight days later, on 14 November 2010.

California is the first Virginia-class submarine built with the advanced electromagnetic signature reduction system; although it will be retrofitted into older submarines of the class.

California was delivered to the Navy on 7 August 2011, eight and a half months ahead of schedule.

The $2.3 billion ship was commissioned on 29 October 2011 in Norfolk, Virginia, with Dana Nelson in command and a crew of 134.

References

External links 

 
 

 

Virginia-class submarines
Nuclear submarines of the United States Navy
2010 ships
Ships built in Newport News, Virginia